Allen Lau is a Hong Kong Canadian entrepreneur who is the co-founder and CEO of Wattpad.

Biography 
Lau was born in Hong Kong, and at age 19, he immigrated to Canada where he attended St. Robert Catholic High School and the University of Toronto. There, he earned his bachelor's degree in electrical engineering in 1991, followed by a master's in electrical engineering in 1992. In 2006, he founded Wattpad, an online platform that allows writers to share their writing with the online Wattpad community. Lau is a prominent member of the Canadian entrepreneurship community; in 2014, he and his wife founded Two Fish Ventures, a venture firm that invests in internet-based startups in the Toronto and Kitchener-Waterloo regions.  In 2021, Wattpad announced that it was being acquired by South Korean conglomerate, Naver, for US$600 million; Wattpad is planning on continuing to run independently with Lau maintaining his leadership position.

References 

Hong Kong businesspeople
Canadian businesspeople
Year of birth missing (living people)
Living people